Château des Hattstatt-Schauenbourg is a castle in the commune of Soultzbach-les-Bains, in the department of Haut-Rhin, Alsace, France. It is a listed historical monument since 2009.

References

Castles in Haut-Rhin
Monuments historiques of Haut-Rhin